The Chief Rabbi of Israel is a religious appointment that began at the time of the British Mandate in Palestine, and continued through to the State of Israel. The post has two nominees, one for the Ashkenazi communities that came from Europe, and one for the Sefaradi communities from North Africa and the Middle East. In recent times the post has become more political than religious.

List of chief rabbis

Chief Rabbinate Council
The chief rabbis also head the Chief Rabbinate Council. These rabbis are usually appointed from the chief rabbis of major cities or regions in Israel.

Among the roles of the council is giving out kosher certification, nominating rabbis able to perform wedding ceremonies, appointing rabbis of cities and appointing religious judges who are able to sit on a Beth Din.

The current members of the council are:

Rabbi David Lau - the Ashkenazi Chief Rabbi
Rabbi Yitzhak Yosef - The Sephardi Chief Rabbi
Rabbi Shimon Elituv - Chief Rabbi of Mateh Binyamin Regional Council
Rabbi Shmuel Eliyahu - Chief Rabbi of Safed, son of former Chief Rabbi, Mordechai
Rabbi Eliezer Simcha Weiss - Rabbi of Kfar Haroeh
Rabbi Yitzchak Dovid Grossman - Chief Rabbi of Migdal HaEmek
Rabbi Yehuda Deri - Chief Rabbi of Beersheba, brother of member of Knesset, Aryeh, related to Chief Rabbi Shlomo Amar by marriage
Rabbi Yitzchak Levi - Chief Rabbi of Nesher
Rabbi Ratzon Arusi - Chief Rabbi of Kiryat Ono
Rabbi Yitzhak Peretz - Chief Rabbi of Raanana
Rabbi Yitzhak Ralbag - former chairman of Jerusalem Rabbinate council and relative by marriage of Chief Rabbi David Lau
General Rabbi Eyal Karim - Chief Rabbi of the Israel Defense Forces
Rabbi Yaakov Rojza - neighbourhood rabbi in Bat Yam / ZAKA
Rabbi Aryeh Stern - Chief Rabbi of Jerusalem
Rabbi Yaakov Shapira - Rosh Yeshiva Mercaz HaRav, son of former Chief Rabbi, Avraham

Chief rabbis of the armed forces 
In addition to the Chief Rabbinate, there is also a position as the Chief Rabbi of the Israel Defense Forces. This individual has a rank of Tat Aluf (Brigadier General).

Religious authorities prior to the British Mandate

The Chief Rabbi of Jerusalem
In addition to the chief rabbis, there were a number of rabbis who served as the head rabbi in Palestine, or of a particular community
Levi ibn Habib (b. Spain)—ruled from Jerusalem but in 1538, Rabbi Jacob Berab who came from Spain via Egypt, sought to revive the Sanhedrin, in Safed, thus making that city the competing capital of the Jewish community in Palestine. He was opposed and exiled by ibn Habib and the rabbis of Jerusalem but Safed remained the competing capital for a number of years thereafter. Berab was succeeded in Safed by Joseph Caro (b. Spain) who was ordained by him.
David ben Solomon ibn Abi Zimra of the Egyptian rabbinate—ruled simultaneously in Jerusalem succeeding ibn Habib. In 1575, Moshe Trani (b. Greece) succeeded Caro in Safed.
Moshe ben Mordechai Galante of Rome—ruled from Jerusalem
Haim Vital—succeeded Trani in Safed but moved his rabbinate to Jerusalem which, once again, became the sole capital of Israel. In 1586, the Nahmanides Synagogue was confiscated by the Arabs and the ben Zakkai Synagogue was built in its stead.
Bezalel Ashkenazi—first chief rabbi to preside in the ben Zakkai Synagogue
Gedaliah Cordovero
Yitzhak Gaon?
Israel Benjamin
Jacob Zemah (b. Portugal)
Samuel Garmison (b. Greece)

Rishon LeZion 1665–1842
Moshe ben Yonatan Galante
Moshe ibn Habib who came from Greece, a descendant of Levi ibn Habib
Moshe Hayun
Avraham Yitzhaki (b. Greece)
Benjamin Maali
Elazar Nahum (b. Turkey)
Nissim Mizrahi
Yitzhak Rapaport
Israel Algazy served until 1756
Raphael Meyuchas ben Shmuel served 1756–1791
Haim ben Asher
Yom Tov Algazy—during whose reign, the French armies of Napoleon invaded Palestine. served until 1802
Moshe Yosef Mordechai Meyuchas served 1802–1805
Yaakov Aish of the Maghreb
Yaakov Coral
Yosef Hazzan (b. Turkey)
Yom Tov Danon
Shlomo Suzin—in 1831, Palestine was briefly conquered by Egypt under Muhammad Ali.
Yonah Navon—Palestine returned to the Ottoman Empire.
Yehuda Navon

The Hakham Bashi 1842–1918
Avraham Haim Gaggin (b. Turkey)
Yitzhak Kovo
Chaim Nissim Abulafia (b. 1795, Tiberias; d. 1860, Jerusalem)
Haim Hazzan (b. Turkey)
Avraham Ashkenazi (b. Greece)
Raphael Panigel (b. Bulgaria)
Yaakov Shaul Elyashar
Yaakov Meir
Yoseph Zundel Salant 
Shmuel Salant 
Eliyahu Moshe Panigel
Nahman Batito
Nissim Danon—In 1917, Palestine was occupied by the British. Danon was succeeded as chief rabbi after World War I by Haim Moshe Eliashar who assumed the title of Acting Chief Rabbi.

References

 
Chief Rabbis of Israel